CAB 2 is the second studio album by the rock/jazz fusion band CAB, released on February 20, 2001 through Tone Center Records. The album was nominated for Best Contemporary Jazz Album at the 2002 Grammy Awards.

Track listing

Personnel
Tony MacAlpine – guitar, keyboard
Brian Auger – keyboard, Hammond organ
Bunny Brunel – keyboard, bass, engineering, production
Dennis Chambers – drums
Joe Yaoub – engineering
Bernard Torelli – engineering, mixing
Emmy Moreau – engineering
Christopher S. Lathan – engineering

Awards

References

External links
In Review: MacAlpine/Brunel/Chambers/Auger "Cab 2" at Guitar Nine Records

CAB (band) albums
2001 albums
Tone Center Records albums
Grammy Award for Best Contemporary Jazz Album